Swan was a brand of soap introduced by the Lever Brothers Company in 1941 to compete with Ivory. Swan may have been advertised as a soap that could be used in the kitchen as a hand soap or in the bathroom to bathe the baby.  Actually, during the radio show My Friend Irma, it was specifically promoted as a dish soap.

Swan, like Ivory, was a floating soap, but Lever had developed and patented a new manufacturing method that both streamlined the process and resulted in a finer product more like milled soap. A typical advertisement boasted that Swan was "the white floating soap that's purer than the finest castiles". Lever and Procter & Gamble became embroiled in litigation over the process and products of it. Lever sued Procter & Gamble for patent infringement after the format of Ivory changed; the Appellate Court found that the patent had been infringed and Procter & Gamble were required to pay $5.675 million to Lever.

Lever Brothers used the Swan brand name to sponsor several radio programs, notably The George Burns and Gracie Allen Show (1941–1945), Joanie's Tea Room (1945–1947), The Bob Hope Show (1948–1949), and My Friend Irma (1947–1951).

Swan's print ads were colorful works of art, and often featured children, babies, soapsuds and, of course, a swan. Some people had the Swan soap ad prints displayed on their wall at home. The art prints were made available to the public as promotional items by the company.

Swan Soap is no longer marketed.

Lawsuits

In 1972, Gladys Young sued the manufacturer of Swan liquid dishwashing detergent, Lever Brothers, and the manufacturer's insurer for damages because of skin irritation allegedly caused by her use of the product between 1968-70.  She testified that a week or two after she started using Swan, the detergent dried out her fingers and they began to itch around the nails. When her nails began to recede within two or three months, Mrs. Young reflected upon the cause and theorized that the change to Swan could have been responsible for the condition.

The district court dismissed her suit after a trial on the merits on September 26, 1973. However, publicity from the trial hurt sales and Swan Detergent was discontinued by 1974.

References

Soap brands